Georgia's 80th District House elects one member of the Georgia House of Representatives. 
Its current representative is Democrat Matthew Wilson.

Elected representatives

References

Georgia House of Representatives districts